Gradius: The Interstellar Assault, released as Nemesis II: The Return of the Hero in Europe, and Nemesis II in Japan, is the second Game Boy game in the Gradius series. The game was later ported to the Konami GB Collection series of Super Game Boy and Game Boy Color compilations; it can be found in the Japanese Vol. 3 and the European Vol. 4. Like Gradius before it, these versions were renamed Gradius II for the Japanese Vol. 3 and Gradius II: The Return of the Hero for the European Vol. 4.

Gameplay
Gradius: The Interstellar Assault retains the traditional horizontal scrolling gameplay from the Gradius series. Once again the player takes control of the Vic Viper and flies through five different stages destroying Bacterion's army.

The game retains the traditional power-up bar from the original Gradius. The player can speed-up multiple times, use missiles, shoot double firepower or lasers, use several options at a time and use the classic shield (although it is referred to as a forcefield). However, before each game is started or continued, the player is given a "Weapon Select" screen. Here the player can choose between one of three settings for the missiles, double firepower, and lasers.

Reception
James Beaven gave the game a 90% in GamesMaster, commenting, "Forget the R-Type games. This is the shoot-em-up to end 'em all! The bad guys don't leave you alone for a second, and the six-strong assortment of power ups, well, 'Way-hey', as Eric Morecambe used to say."

French magazine  gave the game a 92%, saying that it "doesn't let you breath for a second, the enemies come from all sides, and they're multiform. Regularly, you face a colossal monster that nearly takes up the entire screen."

References

External links

Gradius: The Interstellar Assault at Portable Music History

1991 video games
Game Boy games
Game Boy-only games
Gradius video games
Science fiction video games
Side-scrolling video games
Video games developed in Japan

ja:ネメシス (ゲーム)#ネメシスII